Bentley University is a private university focused on business, accountancy, and finance and located in Waltham, Massachusetts. Founded in 1917 as a school of accounting and finance in Boston's Back Bay neighborhood, Bentley moved to Waltham in 1968. Bentley awards Bachelor of Science degrees in 14 business fields and Bachelor of Arts degrees in 11 arts and sciences disciplines, offering 36 minors spanning both arts and science and business disciplines. The graduate school emphasizes the impact of technology on business practice, and offers PhD programs in Business and Accountancy, the Bentley MBA with 16 areas of concentration, an integrated MS+MBA, seven Master of Science degrees, several graduate certificate programs and custom executive education programs.

Bentley's athletic teams compete in Division II of the NCAA (except for men's hockey, which competes in Division I) and are known collectively as the Bentley Falcons. They compete in the Northeast-10 Conference.

History 
Bentley University was founded in 1917 as the Bentley School of Accounting and Finance by Harry C. Bentley, who served as the school's president until 1953. In 1961, the college was accredited to confer four-year Bachelor of Science degrees under President Thomas Lincoln Morison, who moved the college from its Boylston Street address in Boston to its current-day location in Waltham, Massachusetts. Land for this move was purchased from the Lyman Estate in 1962, and the construction to develop the campus then lasted from 1963 to 1968.

Gregory H. Adamian, a major driving force in the college's development, became the fourth president in 1970. Under his guidance, the college became accredited to confer four-year Bachelor of Arts degrees in 1971 and graduate degrees in 1973. During this time, the school also changed its name to Bentley College. In 2002, Bentley College opened up a campus in the Middle Eastern country of Bahrain in partnership with the Bahrain Institute of Banking and Finance. The college was accredited to confer its first doctoral degrees in the fields of business and accountancy in 2005. A main fixture of the campus, The Bentley Library, underwent a sweeping renovation in 2006 during which time the school's logo was changed to showcase the clock tower that sits atop the building. One year later, Gloria Cordes Larson, a former state and federal government official and Boston-based lawyer, became the first female president of Bentley College. In 2008, the school changed its name to Bentley University after being authorized by the state board of higher education to do so. Alison Davis-Blake, the former dean of the Carlson School of Management at the University of Minnesota and of the Ross School of Business at the University of Michigan, became Bentley's eighth president in July 2018. She stepped down in June 2020 and was replaced by Interim President Paul Condrin, the chair of the board of trustees.  In March 2021, the board unanimously appointed Dr. E. LaBrent Chrite to serve as Bentley's ninth president.

Campus

In 1968, Bentley moved from downtown Boston to Waltham, Massachusetts to accommodate an increasing number of students. The first buildings on the Waltham campus were built between 1965 and 1968. Today, the campus stretches across  of land.

Bentley University's campus is divided into three parts: Upper Campus, Lower Campus, and North Campus.

Upper Campus

Upper Campus contains most of the school's academic buildings and all of its classrooms. It is located on the North side of Beaver Street. Upper campus also contains all three freshman dorms, a few upperclassman dorms, and the university's bookstore.

Lower Campus

Lower Campus contains more upperclassman housing, the Dana Athletic Center, and the Multi-Purpose Arena. It is connected to upper campus via a bridge over Beaver Street. It is located on the South side of Beaver Street.

North Campus

North Campus is located a half-mile north of the main entrance to Upper Campus on Forest Street. Transportation to and from North Campus is provided via shuttle bus. North Campus contains only residence hall buildings named: A, B, C and D. Residence halls A and B were opened in 2005 while C and D were opened in 2007, making North Campus the most recent addition to Bentley's housing facilities. Each building has 3 floors and includes an elevator and 2 stairwells. Originally, North Campus was intended to be graduate student housing, but due to the sharp growth of enrollment it is occupied mostly by undergraduates.

Rankings

U.S. News & World Report 
 Top 10 Master's Universities in the North 2018 - Ranked 2nd
 Top 50 Undergraduate Business Programs 2017

Bloomberg Businessweek

Best Undergraduate Business Schools 2016 - Ranked 10th

Princeton Review

 Best Colleges for Career Services 2019 - Ranked 1st
 Best Colleges for Career Services 2018 - Ranked 1st
 Best Colleges for Career Services 2017 - Ranked 2nd
 Best Colleges for Career Services 2016 - Ranked 1st

Graduate programs

McCallum Graduate School of Business
Bentley's McCallum Graduate School of Business offers two master's degrees, the Master of Business Administration (MBA) and the Master of Science. It also has PhD programs.

Bentley User Experience Degree (San Francisco)
The Masters of Human Factors in Information Design program is offered on the West Coast.

Students take four of the required courses in California, five courses online, and the 10th course at Bentley's "User Experience Center".

The program was designed to accommodate the busy schedules of tech professionals and to draw students from a wide geographic area. Each course is delivered in an executive format: three class meetings on Friday, Saturday and Sunday, followed by four weeks of faculty-monitored virtual teamwork, and closing with a Friday/Saturday meeting in the classroom.

Student life

Academic organizations 
Bentley is home to a number of academic organizations. Its Fed Challenge team won the National Fed Challenge in 2010, and won second place in 2012. The university is also home to the Bentley Investment Group, a student-run organization charged with managing a portion of the university's endowment fund. Bentley Investment Group started with $250,000 in 1997 with 24 original members, the assets managed by the club has grown substantially over the past few decades. The technology sector of Bentley Investment Group is currently the largest sector. Other notable academic organizations include Bentley Open Market Committee, Bentley Marketing Association, TAMID, and the Bentley Real Estate Group.

Club sports
In addition to the intercollegiate and intramural programs, the university offers a number of club sports for students to take part in. These clubs are operated within the Student Activities department, and are financially supported by the student's activity fees. One of the most notable club sports is the Bentley Equestrian Team which was created by Bentley University because of the founder of Bentley University, Harry C. Bentley,  enjoyed horseback riding in his free time.  Other Club Sports include: cheerleading, dance team, men's rugby, women's rugby, men's ultimate frisbee (2014 USA Ultimate Div-III Champions), women's ultimate frisbee, men's volleyball, men's hockey, women's hockey, and sailing.

Campus media
 The Vanguard: student-produced weekly on-campus newspaper 
 The Vale: student-produced yearbook
 Bentley TV: student-produced TV station broadcasting on channel 45 on campus
 Piecework: student-produced annual literary magazine
 Bentley Observer: staff-produced quarterly magazine for alumni
 WBTY - Radio Bentley: on-campus radio station, operating at 105.3 FM
 Falcon Records (Massachusetts): an independent record label focused on promoted local artists in Boston and providing free and entertaining music to consumers
Fusio: an academic research journal published by the university's honors program

Fraternities and sororities
There are currently seven recognized men's fraternities at Bentley University: Alpha Epsilon Pi, Alpha Gamma Pi, Delta Kappa Epsilon, Kappa Sigma, Sigma Chi, Sigma Gamma Delta, and Sigma Pi. Five chapters are inter/national and are governed by the North American Interfraternity Conference. Two of the men's organizations are local groups which means that Bentley University is the only institution that houses these chapters.

There currently are four recognized women's sororities at Bentley University: Alpha Phi, Gamma Phi Beta, Kappa Delta, and Phi Sigma Sigma. These chapters are governed by the National Panhellenic Conference or the National Association of Latina/Latino Fraternal Organizations, Inc.

In the 2017–2018 academic year, Greek organizations raised over $60,000 through philanthropic events held on campus.

There are also two business fraternities on campus, Alpha Kappa Psi and Delta Sigma Pi. They are co-ed, and hold numerous professional events throughout the year.

There is a chapter of Alpha Psi Omega National Theater Honors Society, which performs a fall musical and a spring play every year.

There is one co-ed service fraternity, Alpha Phi Omega, chartered 2018, which provides its members opportunities to volunteer through a variety of community service events and fundraisers.

Athletics

Bentley's mascot is Flex the Falcon. The university has 23 men's and women's varsity teams. All of the teams compete in the Northeast-10 Conference at the NCAA Division II level, with the exception of the men's hockey program, which was one of the original six founding teams of Atlantic Hockey at the Division I level.

Bentley is also home to one of the best rugby programs in the Northeast winning two national Division III titles in 2007 and 2008 as well as winning the 2008 Beast of the East tournament. They were also Division II National Qualifiers in 2011 and 2012 as well as Rugby Northeast Conference champions in 2011.

In 2001, the Bentley Field Hockey team won the NCAA Division II national championship.

In 2012, the Bentley Men's Cross Country team finished 26th in the nation at Division II XC Nationals. In 2015, the Bentley Men's Cross Country team qualified for the NCAA Division II Cross Country Championships and finished 30th in the nation.

After beating Saint Michael's College by a score of 85–65 on February 23, 2008, the Bentley University Men's Basketball team set the record for the longest regular season winning streak in Division II history. Additionally, Bentley has men's, women's, and co-ed intramural programs for the fall, winter, and spring semesters.

The Bentley Women's Basketball team completed the 2013–2014 season with a 35–0 record, winning the NCAA Division II National Championship.

The Bentley Men's Ultimate Frisbee team won USA Ultimate's Division III College Championship in 2014.

Bentley is the #2 ranked school among all NCAA Division II colleges and universities in U.S., according to Next College Student Athlete's 2018 NCSA Power Rankings. The NCSA Power Rankings recognize the best colleges and universities in the U.S. for student-athletes. NCSA ranked Bentley Football #1 for DII schools and #63 overall. Among all DII schools, Bentley also ranked #1 in Men's and Women's Lacrosse; #2 in Men's and Women's Basketball, Men's and Women's Soccer, Men's and Women's Swimming, Men's and Women's Tennis, Men's Golf, Women's Field Hockey, Women's Volleyball, Softball, and Baseball; and #3 in Men's and Women's Track and Field. Bentley University Men's Ice Hockey ranked #20 among NCAA DI schools.

Bentley Arena
The Bentley Arena is a multi-purpose ice hockey arena on the campus of Bentley University in Waltham, Massachusetts. It is home to the Bentley Falcons men's ice hockey program, replacing the previous facility, the John A. Ryan Arena. The first hockey game was on February 16, 2018, with Bentley taking on Army West Point. The seating capacity for hockey games is 2,207.

The 76,000 square foot facility was designed by Architectural Resources Cambridge and built by Suffolk Construction. Ground broke on the Arena in the summer of 2016, and was completed in February 2018.

In May 2018, the Arena was awarded an LEED Platinum rating, the highest possible rating for sustainability, according to the U.S. Green Building Council.

Since opening, the arena has hosted various events, such as Bentley's annual Spring Day concert, the Back to Bentley concert, and the Spring Comedy Show.

Musical artists such as SZA, Vince Staples, and Khalid have performed at the arena, as have comedians such as Nick Offerman, Nick Kroll, and Wayne Brady.

Notable people

Alumni
 George J. Bates, former member of the United States House of Representatives from the state of Massachusetts
 Mackenzy Bernadeau, '08, professional football player who was last with the Jacksonville Jaguars organization; drafted 250th overall in 2008 NFL Draft by the Carolina Panthers.
 Gailanne Cariddi, former member of the Massachusetts House of Representatives
 C.C. Chapman, '96, American author and marketing consultant
 Marcelo Claure, '93, President and CEO of Sprint Corporation and founder of Brightstar Corp.
 Patricia Courtney, infielder in All-American Girls Professional Baseball League
 Arthur T. Demoulas, CEO of Demoulas Supermarkets (Market Basket)
 James F. Donovan, Businessman, industrialist and Bentley University trustee
 William C. Freda '74, Vice Chairman and Senior Partner (Retired), Deloitte LLP, New York, NY
 Brian Hammel, '75, former Bentley basketball player and coach who was drafted by the Milwaukee Bucks in the third round of the 1975 NBA Draft
 Gail Huff, '84, Broadcast journalist for WJLA-TV and the wife of Scott Brown, former U.S. Senator from Massachusetts
 Michael Jingozian, '91, founder and CEO, AngelVision, TV producer, and former presidential candidate for the Libertarian Party
 Robert B. Kennedy, American politician
 Edward J. King, '53, professional football player with Buffalo Bills and Baltimore Colts 1948–1950; Governor of Massachusetts 1979–1983
 David Krikorian, former candidate for Ohio's 2nd congressional district
 William Landergan, member of the Massachusetts House of Representatives from 1935 to 1937 
 Todd J. Leach, MBA '85, Chancellor of the University System of New Hampshire
 Jay Leno, former host of The Tonight Show; attended for one semester
 Lisa Lutoff-Perlo, President & CEO of Celebrity Cruises
 Christopher P. Lynch, MBA '91, American Venture Capitalist and entrepreneur
 Mike Mangini, '85, drummer of Dream Theater; former drum teacher at Berklee College of Music
 David Pakman, MBA, host of The David Pakman Show
 Frederick G. Payne, '25, former U.S. Senator from Maine and the 60th Governor of Maine
 Jack Perri, head coach of men's basketball at Southern New Hampshire University, previously LIU Brooklyn
 Edward J. Powers, former president and general manager of the Boston Garden
 Fahim Saleh, '09, founder of Gokada, Pathao, and JoBike
 Ryan Soderquist, '00, current head coach of Bentley Falcons men's ice hockey team and all-time points and goals leader
 Charles Taylor, '77, warlord and 22nd President of Liberia; convicted war criminal
 Jason Westrol, '10, former Bentley basketball player who last played for the Limburg United of the Belgian Basketball League

Faculty and staff
 Mohammad Javad Abdolmohammadi, John E. Rhodes Professor of Accounting at Bentley since 1988
 Amir Aczel, lecturer in mathematics and the history of mathematics and science, as well as an author of popular books on mathematics and science
 Gregory H. Adamian, Bentley's fourth president
 Harry C. Bentley, founder and first president of Bentley
 Thom Boerman, Bentley football coach from 2009 to 2013
 Selin Sayek Böke, Turkish politician who worked in Bentley's Economics department as an assistant professor
 Robert Connors, former offensive coordinator for the Bentley football team
 Alison Davis-Blake, Bentley's eighth president from 2018 to 2020
 Daniel Everett, linguist famed for his work with the Pirahã language and contradicting Noam Chomsky's theories related to language universals
 Brian Hammel, former Bentley men's basketball coach and Milwaukee Bucks draft pick in 1975
 Hal Kopp, Bentley football coach from 1972 to 1975
 Gloria Cordes Larson, Bentley's seventh president
 Steve Marchena, guitar instructor-in-residence at Bentley
 Jack Perri, head coach of men's basketball at Southern New Hampshire University, previously LIU Brooklyn
 Jack Regan, Bentley football coach from 1976 to 1978
 Alvin Reynolds, current Bentley football coach
 Bobby Shuttleworth, former Bentley men's soccer assistant coach and New England Revolution player
 Peter Simonini, former Bentley men's soccer coach
 Ryan Soderquist, current head coach of the Bentley Falcons men's ice hockey team (2001–present)
 Barbara Stevens, longtime women's basketball coach and Naismith Basketball Hall of Fame member
 Scott Sumner, noted economist and professor
 Peter Yetten, Bentley football coach from 1979 to 2008

References

External links
 
 Bentley Athletics website

 
Business schools in Massachusetts
Educational institutions established in 1917
Buildings and structures in Waltham, Massachusetts
Universities and colleges in Middlesex County, Massachusetts
Private universities and colleges in Massachusetts
1917 establishments in Massachusetts